Puigaudeau is a surname. Notable people with the surname include: 

Ferdinand du Puigaudeau (1864–1930), French painter
Odette du Puigaudeau (1894–1991), French ethnologist